The New Royales are a four-person music group consisting of members DJ Khalil, Chin Injeti, Liz Rodrigues, and Erik Alcock. Since forming in 2007, they have worked together as producers and songwriters for artists such as Eminem, Pitbull, Pink, Bishop Lamont, Jay Electronica and more. The group is known for incorporating musical styles from multiple genres, drawing influence from hip hop and soul, Brazilian and Portuguese music, to rock and pop music.

Widely known as a production group for other artists, they released their first official mixtape Freedom's for the Brave on January 14, 2014. Freedom's for the Brave pays homage to a number of the group's influences, featuring covers of bands and groups such as The Kinks, The Monks, The Beatles, The White Stripes, Depeche Mode and more. They followed this with the release of Ready to Break in 2015.

Discography

2008
Bishop Lamont – The Confessional
05. "City Lights (feat. Erik of The New Royales)"

2009

Pitbull – Rebelution
07. "Can't Stop Me Now (feat. The New Royales)"
Slaughterhouse (group) – Slaughterhouse
05. "The One"

2010
Chin Injeti – D'tach
05. "Separated (feat. The New Royales)"
06. "Love Is Not War (feat. Zaki Ibrahim)"

Eminem – Recovery
02. "Talkin' 2 Myself (feat. Kobe)"
04. "Won't Back Down (feat. Pink (singer))"
12. "25 to Life"
14. "Almost Famous"

EA Sports – "Fight Night Champion"
"China"
"Live 4 Tomorrow"
"Red"
"Organ Man"
"Running Thru"

2012
Pink (singer) – The Truth About Love
11. "Here Comes the Weekend (feat. Eminem)"

2013
Eminem – The Marshall Mathers LP 2
05. "Survival"

2014
The New Royales – Freedom's for the Brave

2015
Eminem - "Kings Never Die (feat. Gwen Stefani)"
The New Royales - "Ready to Break"

References

External links
Official website

American hip hop record producers
Record production teams